Cudahy is a city located in southeastern Los Angeles County, California, United States. In area, Cudahy is the second smallest city in Los Angeles County after Hawaiian Gardens but with one of the highest population densities of any incorporated city in the United States. It is part of the Gateway Cities region and had a population of 23,805 as of the 2010 U.S. Census.

History

Cudahy is named for its founder, meat-packing baron Michael Cudahy, who purchased the original  of Rancho San Antonio in 1908 to resell as  lots. Such parcels, often referred to as "railroad lots", were intended to allow the new town's residents to keep a large vegetable garden, a grove of fruit trees (usually citrus), and a chicken coop or horse stable. This arrangement, popular in the towns along the lower Los Angeles and San Gabriel rivers, proved particularly attractive to the Southerners and Midwesterners who were leaving their struggling farms in droves in the 1910s and 1920s to start new lives in Southern California.

Sam Quinones of the Los Angeles Times said that the large, narrow parcels of land gave Cudahy Acres a "rural feel in an increasingly urban swath." As late as the 1950s, some Cudahy residents were still riding into the city's downtown areas on horseback. After World War II the city was a White American blue collar town with steel and automobile plants in the area.

By the late 1970s, the factories closed down and the white residents of Cudahy left for jobs and housing in the San Gabriel and San Fernando Valleys. Stucco apartment complexes were built on former tracts of land. The population density increased; in 2007 the city was the second-densest in California, after Maywood.

The city was subjected to a major political corruption incident when the former mayor and the one-time city manager were indicted on bribery and extortion charges for supporting the opening of a medical marijuana dispensary. As a result of these charges, on July 12, 2012, ex-mayor David Silva, councilman Osvaldo Conde, and former City Manager Angel Perales, 43, each pleaded guilty to one count of bribery and extortion; according to plea agreements they each face up to 30 years in prison.

On January 14, 2020, Delta Air Lines Flight 89 dumped jet fuel onto Cudahy, while making an emergency landing at Los Angeles International Airport. Park Avenue Elementary School suffered the brunt of this dumping. This incident sparked outrage because of the city's previous history of environmental damage, including the construction of the same school on top of an old dump site that contained contaminated soil with toxic sludge, and pollution from the Exide battery plant. The mayor, Elizabeth Alcantar, pushed for better compensation from Delta for the impact on residents and the city.

Geography

Cudahy is bordered by Bell on the north, Bell Gardens on the east, South Gate on the south and southwest, and Huntington Park on the west.

In 2007, of the 5,800 housing units, 5,000 were rentals.

Demographics

2010
At the 2010 census Cudahy had a population of 23,805. The racial makeup of Cudahy was 11,708 (49.2%) White (2.1% Non-Hispanic White), 333 (1.4%) African American, 246 (1.0%) Native American, 137 (0.6%) Asian, 24 (0.1%) Pacific Islander, 10,339 (43.4%) from other races, and 1,018 (4.3%) from two or more races. Hispanic or Latino of any race were 22,850 persons (96.0%).

The census reported that 23,797 people (100% of the population) lived in households, 8 (0%) lived in non-institutionalized group quarters, and no one was institutionalized.

There were 5,607 households, 3,712 (66.2%) had children under the age of 18 living in them, 2,941 (52.5%) were opposite-sex married couples living together, 1,362 (24.3%) had a female householder with no husband present, 686 (12.2%) had a male householder with no wife present.  There were 589 (10.5%) unmarried opposite-sex partnerships, and 42 (0.7%) same-sex married couples or partnerships. 399 households (7.1%) were one person and 176 (3.1%) had someone living alone who was 65 or older. The average household size was 4.24.  There were 4,989 families (89.0% of households); the average family size was 4.32.

The age distribution was 8,325 people (35.0%) under the age of 18, 2,858 people (12.0%) aged 18 to 24, 7,279 people (30.6%) aged 25 to 44, 4,121 people (17.3%) aged 45 to 64, and 1,222 people (5.1%) who were 65 or older.  The median age was 27.0 years. For every 100 females, there were 98.3 males.  For every 100 females age 18 and over, there were 95.5 males.

There were 5,770 housing units at an average density of 4,706.5 per square mile, of the occupied units 1,011 (18.0%) were owner-occupied and 4,596 (82.0%) were rented. The homeowner vacancy rate was 1.3%; the rental vacancy rate was 2.3%.  4,355 people (18.3% of the population) lived in owner-occupied housing units and 19,442 people (81.7%) lived in rental housing units.

According to the 2010 United States Census, Cudahy had a median household income of $38,267, with 31.8% of the population living below the federal poverty line.

2000
At the 2000 census there were 24,208 people in 5,419 households, including 4,806 families, in the city. The population density was 21,627.7 inhabitants per square mile (8,345.3/km). The racial makeup of the city was 43.14% White, 1.24% Black or African American, 1.28% Native American, 0.74% Asian, 0.17% Pacific Islander, 48.06% from other races, and 5.37% from two or more races.  94.14% of the population were Hispanic or Latino of any race.
Of the 5,419 households 66.0% had children under the age of 18 living with them, 57.6% were married couples living together, 21.7% had a female householder with no husband present, and 11.3% were non-families. 8.1% of households were one person and 3.5% were one person aged 65 or older.  The average household size was 4.47 and the average family size was 4.58.

The age distribution was 39.9% under the age of 18, 12.4% from 18 to 24, 32.3% from 25 to 44, 11.7% from 45 to 64, and 3.7% 65 or older.  The median age was 24 years. For every 100 females, there were 97.7 males.  For every 100 females age 18 and over, there were 97.4 males.

The median income for a household in the city was $29,040, and the median family income  was $28,833. Males had a median income of $19,149 versus $16,042 for females. The per capita income for the city was $8,688.  About 26.4% of families and 28.3% of the population were below the poverty line, including 34.1% of those under age 18 and 18.1% of those age 65 or over.

Latino communities

Government
In the Los Angeles County Board of Supervisors, Cudahy is in the Fourth District, represented by Janice Hahn.

Cudahy's council is elected through at-large elections with four-year seats.

Elections

2015
In March 2015, Measure A, which proposed a term limit of two four-year terms for City Council members, with partial terms of any length counting as a full term, was put to a vote. The measure was approved, with 672 "yes" votes to 133 "no" votes.

In that same election, five people (Christian Hernandez, Cristian Markovich, Adam Ochoa, Diane Oliva, and Baru Sanchez) ran for three city council seats. Hernandez, Markovich, and Sanchez won the election.

Infrastructure
Police Services used to be contracted through the City of Maywood, but now contracts with the Los Angeles County Sheriff's Department.

The Los Angeles County Department of Health Services operates the Whittier Health Center in Whittier, serving Cudahy.

The United States Postal Service Cudahy Post Office is located at 4619 Elizabeth Street.

Economy
After World War II the population of Cudahy worked for plants operated by General Motors, Chrysler, Firestone, and Bethlehem Steel. In 2007 the largest employers in Cudahy were the Kmart/Big Lots Center and the Superior Super Warehouse.

Education
Cudahy is a part of the Los Angeles Unified School District. Cudahy is served by several schools, including Teresa Hughes Elementary School, Park Avenue Elementary School, Elizabeth Learning Center (a neighborhood school for grades K-8 and a high school for grades 9 through 12), Ochoa Learning Center (K-8), and Bell High School in Bell.

All residents are zoned to Bell High School. Any student who lives in the Bell or Huntington Park High School zones may apply to Maywood Academy High School; Maywood Academy, which opened in 2005 and moved into its permanent campus in 2006, does not have its own attendance boundary because it lacks American football, track and field, and tennis facilities.

Jaime Escalante Elementary School opened in Cudahy on August 16, 2010, named after Jaime Escalante, who was an East Los Angeles-high school educator.

An analysis based on census data, classified Cudahy as the 4th least educated city in California with 37.9 of its population not having completed the ninth grade.

Public libraries
The County of Los Angeles Public Library operates the Cudahy Library at 5218 Santa Ana Street.

See also

 Gateway Cities

References

Further reading
 Watanabe, Teresa. "Parents' campaign leads to reforms at Cudahy elementary school." Los Angeles Times. January 26, 2014.

External links

Cities in Los Angeles County, California
Gateway Cities
Cudahy family
Incorporated cities and towns in California
Populated places established in 1960
1960 establishments in California
Chicano and Mexican neighborhoods in California